Ferenc Krausz (born 17 May 1962 in Mór, Hungary) is a Hungarian-Austrian physicist, whose research team has generated and measured the first attosecond light pulse and used it for capturing electrons’ motion inside atoms, marking the birth of attophysics.

Academic career 
Krausz studied theoretical physics at Eötvös Loránd University and electrical engineering at the Technical University of Budapest in Hungary. After his habilitation at the Technical University of Vienna, in Austria, he became professor at the same institute. In 2003 he was appointed director at the Max Planck Institute for Quantum Optics in Garching and in 2004 became chair of experimental physics at the Ludwig Maximilians University in Munich. In 2006 he co-founded the Munich-Centre of Advanced Photonics (MAP) and began serving as one of its directors.

Research 
Ferenc Krausz and his research team were the first to create and measure a light pulse lasting less than one femtosecond. The researchers used these attosecond light pulses to make the inner-atomic movement of electrons observable in real time. These results marked the beginning of attosecond physics.

In the 1990s, the groundwork for this landmark was done by Ferenc Krausz and his team with a large number of innovations to the further development of the femtosecond laser technology to its ultimate limits – towards light pulses which carry the major part of their energy in one single oscillation of the electromagnetic field. An indispensable prerequisite for the generation of such short light pulses is the high-precision control of the delay of the different color components of broadband (white) light over one entire octave. Aperiodic multi-layers (chirped mirrors) emerging from a collaboration of Ferenc Krausz and Robert Szipöcs made such a control possible and are indispensable in today's femtosecond laser systems.

In 2001, Ferenc Krausz and his group were able for the first time not only to generate but also to measure attosecond light pulses (of extreme ultraviolet light) by means of intense laser pulses consisting of one to two wave cycles. With this, they were shortly thereafter also able to trace the movement of electrons on the subatomic scale in real time. The control of the wave form of the femtosecond pulse demonstrated by Ferenc Krausz and his team and the resulting reproducible attosecond pulses enabled the establishment of the attosecond measuring technique as the technological basis for experimental attosecond physics today. Over the past few years, Ferenc Krausz and his coworkers succeeded with these tools to control electrons in molecules and – for the first time – observe in real time a large number of fundamental electron processes such as tunneling, charge transport, coherent EUV emission, delayed photoelectric effect, valence electron movement and the control of the optical and electrical properties of dielectrics. These results have been achieved with international cooperations with groups of scientists such as Joachim Burgdörfer, Paul Corkum, Theodor Hänsch, Misha Ivanov, Ulrich Heinzmann, Stephen Leone, Robin Santra, Mark Stockman and Marc Vrakking.

Krausz and his attoworld-team are now using femtosecond laser technology, which served as the basis for attosecond measurement technology, to further develop infrared spectroscopy for biomedical applications. Biological samples excited with ultrashort infrared laser pulses emit infrared waves. By scanning the electric field of these waves, minute changes in the molecular composition of the samples under investigation can be detected by measuring the so-called "electric-field molecular fingerprint (EMF)." The aim of the research collaboration "Lasers4Life" and "Center for Molecular Fingerprinting", consisting of laser physicists, mathematicians, physicians and molecular biologists, is to use the measurement of the EMF of blood samples to track the health of people ("health monitoring") and to detect diseases at an early stage ("disease detection").

Prizes 
 2006 - Royal Photographic Society Progress medal and Honorary Fellowship
 2013 - Otto Hahn Prize
 2016 - Member of the German Academy of Sciences Leopoldina.
 2019 - Vladilen Letokhov Medal.
 2022 - Wolf Prize in Physics.
 2022 - BBVA Foundation Frontiers of Knowledge Award in Basic Sciences.

References

External links 
 Portrait at the Deutsche Forschungsgesellschaft
 Homepage of Ferenc Krausz
 Homepage of the group of Ferenc Krausz
 Munich-Center for Advanced Photonics

20th-century Hungarian physicists
Science teachers
Academic staff of the Ludwig Maximilian University of Munich
Gottfried Wilhelm Leibniz Prize winners
People from Mór
Hungarian expatriates in Germany
TU Wien alumni
Academic staff of TU Wien
1962 births
Living people
Hungarian nuclear physicists
Theoretical physicists
Foreign Members of the Russian Academy of Sciences
Members of the German Academy of Sciences Leopoldina
Max Planck Institute directors